Malacates Trebol Shop is a Guatemalan Rock Pop Latino band best known for their innovative and unique compositions. The band's varied musical style has fused traditional rock and ska with various elements of insanos and pop. They have recorded five Albums:

 Paquetecuetes
 Sí 
 Sólo éxitos…(dicen) 
 De Que Sirve Querer?
 A quien corresponda

From the Album Paquetecuetes the singles: Ni un Centavo, Mojado, Pa'que te acuerdes de mi, were top hits of popularity in the Central American Radios for more than 15 weeks.

With the Album Sí their singles were Quisiera, Mariachi Funky Disco, Canción dentro de mí and Morena, theme that was the official campaign song for Pepsi in 2000.  The single Tómame was also the official campaign song for Summer in 2005 for the Beer: Cerveza Gallo, the Most important Beer in Guatemala and Central America.

Malacates have presented in Guatemala, Honduras, El Salvador, Switzerland, Germany, Spain, Mexico, and U.S.A., where they have shared stage with artist's like:

Juanes, Aleks Syntek, Carlos Vives, Chi-chi Peralta, Jaguares, Fonseca, Elefante, Franco de Vita, Moenia, Fanny Lu, Elvis Crespo, Bacilos, Inner Circle, Rabanes, Belanova.
 
In the year 2007, they were nominated for being the best national band of Guatemala by Los Premios Principales in Madrid, Spain, event organized from the 40 popular radio stations.

Albums
 Paquetecuetes (1999)

   1. Malacates
   2. Ni un centavo
   3. ¿Quién sos?
   4. Pa'que te acuerdes de mi
   5. Siempre lo mismo
   6. 40 R
   7. Por esta noche
   8. Arreglo Zapatos
   9. Ponte en 4
  10. Mojado
  11. La Niña-ishta concupiscente
  12. 25
  13. Dolor
  14. Hoy no
  15. Bai-klin
  16. Ni un centavo (version rockola)

 Si (2002)
  
 1. Quisiera
   2. Mariachi Funky Disco
   3. Otra vez
   4. El Baile del Chinique
   5. El Beso
   6. La Niña #2
   7. Canción Dentro de Mí
   8. Gracias a Dios
   9. Ay de Mí
  10. Isabel
  11. Otra de Payasos
  12. Morena

 Solo Exitos ...dicen... (2005)

   1. Como Jaime Viñals
   2. El Regalito
   3. Tere
   4. Déjame llegar
   5. El vaso
   6. Otra Botella más
   7. Tómame
   8. Acapulco
   9. Quisiera
  10. Ni un Centavo
  11. Pa'que te acuerdes de mi
  12. Morena
  13. Mojado
  14. Canción dentro de mi

 "¿De qué sirve querer?" (2008)

   1.	¿De Qué Sirve Querer?  
   2.	Este Es El Bar  
   3.	Todo se pagará  
   4.	Yo quiero ser  
   5.	Amor de tres  
   6.	Casablanca  
   7.	Bella  
   8.	Déjame  
   9.	Tango Pa´ti  
   10.	Luna de Xelajú  
   11.	Outro 
 
 "A quien corresponda" (2014)

   1. Lágrimas por Thelma  
   2. Preciosa  
   3. Todo tu Amor  
   4. Luna Llena – ft Gaby Moreno  
   5. Dormido  
   6. De Colores  
   7. Corazón  
   8. Tal Vez – ft Rebeca Lane  
   9. El Ayer No Va a Volver  
   10. 1982

Members 
 Francisco Páez - Vocals
 Jacobo Nitsch - Trumpet
 Rodolfo Hernández - Guitar
 Leonel Hernández - Drums

Guatemalan musical groups